Edmund Ford may refer to:

E. B. Ford, ecological geneticist
Edmund Ford (MP died 1440), MP for Bath
Edmund Ford (16th-century MP), MP for Midhurst